St. Conleth's Reformatory School was a reformatory in Daingean, County Offaly which operated from 1870 - 1973. It was run by the Missionary Oblates of Mary Immaculate.

The campus was formerly constructed as a military barracks around the year 1800 but was converted to a reformatory school around the year 1870.

Unlike industrial schools, boys at this school were convicted of offences that would have resulted in prison or penal servitude had they been committed by adults. However the school was one of those investigated by the Ryan Commission.

The complex is now used as a storage facility for the National Museum of Ireland and is owned by the Office of Public Works.

References

Defunct schools in the Republic of Ireland
Education in County Offaly